Milking the bull is a proverb which uses the metaphor of milking a bull to indicate that an activity would be fruitless or futile.

In the 16th century, the German painter Hans Schäufelein illustrated the proverb on the eight of bells in a deck of playing cards.
 
Dr Johnson used the proverb to criticise the work of David Hume and other skeptical philosophers.

See also
Tilting at windmills
Male lactation
Collection of semen from bulls

References

Metaphors
Proverbs